Harpy is a comic book supervillain in DC Comics.

Publication history
The first Harpy was a World War I aviator named Denise de Sevigne and foe of Hans Von Hammer, the Enemy Ace. She first appeared in Star-Spangled War Stories #140 (September 1968), and was created by Robert Kanigher and Joe Kubert.

Fictional character biography
Countess Denise de Sevigne is the sister of Andre de Sevigne, perhaps the fiercest enemy of Hans von Hammer, aka, Enemy Ace. She had conflicting feelings about Hammer, but eventually decided to become a flying ace on her own in order to avenge her brother's death, taking the codename of Harpy.

References

Comics characters introduced in 1968
DC Comics female supervillains
Fictional World War I veterans
Fictional aviators
Characters created by Robert Kanigher
Characters created by Joe Kubert
Fictional counts and countesses
Cultural depictions of Harpies